Elmer "Trim" Capshaw (November 27, 1893 – April 13, 1953) was an American football player and coach of football and basketball. He served as the head football coach at the Colorado School of Mines in Golden, Colorado from 1921 to 1922. Capshaw was also the head basketball coach at Colorado Mines in 1921–22. He played college football at the University of Oklahoma from 1912 to 1915.

References

External links
 

1893 births
1953 deaths
American football halfbacks
Basketball coaches from Oklahoma
Colorado Mines Orediggers football coaches
Colorado Mines Orediggers men's basketball coaches
Oklahoma Sooners football players
Sportspeople from Norman, Oklahoma
Players of American football from Oklahoma